Ek Tho Chance is a 2009 Bollywood erotic thriller film directed by Saeed Akhtar Mirza and produced by Rangita Pritish Nandy under Pritish Nandy Communications. The music director is Ismail Darbar.

The film stars Amrita Arora, Purab Kohli, Ali Fazal, Pawan Malhotra, Vijay Raaz, and others. The film premiered at the 2009 Film Festival of Kerala.

Plot
The film tells the tale of Mumbai city and the millions who get off the train at VT station at every second of the day, hoping to latch on to the magic of Mumbai.

Cast
 Amrita Arora as Nishi
 Purab Kohli
 Ali Fazal as Smridh
 Vijay Raaz
 Pawan Malhotra
 Zafar Karachiwala
 Ashwini Kalsekar
 Rajat Kapoor
 Saurabh Shukla
 Vinay Pathak
 Imaad Shah

References

External links
 
 Complete Cast & Crew: at Bollywood Hungama

2009 films
Films set in Mumbai
2000s erotic thriller films
Indian erotic thriller films
2000s Hindi-language films
Films directed by Saeed Akhtar Mirza